Gilles Bellemare (born 22 November 1932, Shawinigan, Mauricie – 15 August 1980) was a Canadian politician from Quebec.

He ran as a Liberal candidate in 1973 for the district of Rosemont and won with 51% of the vote. He was defeated in 1976 with 33% of the vote.  He was succeeded by Parti Québécois candidate Gilbert Paquette.

Footnotes

1932 births
1980 deaths
Gilles
People from Shawinigan
Quebec Liberal Party MNAs